The Kalik 44 is a sailboat that was designed by Gary Mull and first built in 1980. The design is out of production.

The Kalik 44 is a development of the Kalik 40, with the hull lengthened and was developed into the Ocean 44.

Production
The boat was built by Jachtwerf Vennekens in Belgium, starting in 1980.

Design
The Kalik 44 is a small recreational keelboat, built predominantly of fiberglass, with wood trim. It has a masthead sloop rig, an internally mounted skeg rudder and a fixed fin keel. It displaces  and carries  of ballast.

The boat has a PHRF racing average handicap of 90.

See also
List of sailing boat types

References

Keelboats
1980s sailboat type designs
Sailing yachts
Sailboat type designs by Gary Mull
Sailboat types built by Jachtwerf Vennekens